The Haier Super 8 T20 Cup was the top-tier domestic Twenty20 cricket league in Pakistan from 2011 to 2015. The top 8 teams from the National T20 Cup qualified for the tournament. However, it was made defunct with the initiation of the Pakistan Super League in 2016, which currently features 6 city-based franchises from within Pakistan and is independent of the National T20 Cup.

League

Results

See also

 List of domestic Twenty20 cricket competitions

References

National Twenty20 Cup
Twenty20 cricket leagues
Pakistani domestic cricket competitions
Professional sports leagues in Pakistan
2011 establishments in Pakistan
Cricket
Sports leagues established in 2011
Recurring sporting events established in 2011
Recurring sporting events disestablished in 2015
Defunct cricket competitions